Alison Steadman  (born 26 August 1946) is an English actress. She received the 1991 National Society of Film Critics Award for Best Actress for the Mike Leigh film Life Is Sweet and the 1993 Olivier Award for Best Actress for her role as Mari in the original production of The Rise and Fall of Little Voice. In a 2007 Channel 4 poll, the ‘50 Greatest Actors’ voted for by other actors, she was ranked 42.

Steadman made her professional stage debut in 1968 and went on to establish her career in Mike Leigh's 1970s TV plays Nuts in May (1976) and Abigail's Party (1977). She received BAFTA TV Award nominations for the 1986 BBC serial The Singing Detective and in 2001 for the ITV drama series Fat Friends (2000–2005). Other television roles include Pride and Prejudice (1995), Gavin & Stacey (2007–2010, 2019) and Orphan Black (2015–2016). Her other film appearances include A Private Function (1984), Topsy-Turvy (1999), The Life and Death of Peter Sellers (2004), Dad's Army (2016) and The King's Man (2021).

Early life and education
Steadman was born in Liverpool, the youngest of three sisters born to Marjorie (née Evans) and George Percival Steadman, who worked as a production controller for Plessey, an electronics firm.

Steadman was educated at Childwall Valley High School for Girls, a state grammar school in the Liverpool suburb of Childwall, followed by East 15 Acting School, at which she secured a place in the autumn of 1966 and where she met Mike Leigh during her second year.

Career

Stage work
Having left the East 15 Acting School in Loughton, Essex, Steadman worked in various regional repertory theatres, starting at Lincoln in 1968, where her first role was the schoolgirl Sandy in The Prime of Miss Jean Brodie. She created the role of the monstrous Beverly in Mike Leigh's Abigail's Party, which she reprised with the original cast on television. She won an Olivier Award for The Rise and Fall of Little Voice and also appeared in Cat on a Hot Tin Roof, Entertaining Mr Sloane, Hotel Paradiso, and others in locations as diverse as the Royal Court, the Theatre Royal, the Old Vic, the Hampstead Theatre, the Nottingham Playhouse, the Everyman Liverpool and the National Theatre. She starred as Elmire in the 1983 RSC production of Molière's Tartuffe, which was adapted for BBC television.  In 2010 Steadman played Madame Arcati in a revival of Noël Coward's Blithe Spirit. In 2014 Steadman appeared as Madame Raquin in Helen Edmundson's adaptation of Emile Zola's Thérèse Raquin.

Film
Steadman has appeared in many films, including P'tang, Yang, Kipperbang (1982), Champions (1983), A Private Function (1984), Number One (1984), Clockwise (1986), Stormy Monday (1988), The Adventures of Baron Munchausen (1988), Shirley Valentine (1989), Wilt (1989), Life Is Sweet (1990), Blame It on the Bellboy (1992), Secrets & Lies (1996), Topsy-Turvy (1999), The Life and Death of Peter Sellers (2004), Confetti (2006), Burn Burn Burn (2015) and 23 Walks (2020).

Television
Steadman's television work includes Fat Friends as Betty, Grumpy Old Women, Stressed Eric, Let Them Eat Cake, The Singing Detective, No Bananas, The Caucasian Chalk Circle, Adrian Mole: The Cappuccino Years as Pauline Mole, opposite James Bolam in the television film The Missing Postman, and Pride and Prejudice as Mrs. Bennet. In 1991, she also appeared as Edda Göring in Selling Hitler and as Lauren Patterson in Gone to the Dogs, which was then followed up by Gone to Seed.

Television productions directed by Leigh in which she has appeared include Nuts in May, Hard Labour and Abigail's Party. She also appeared in the BBC comedy The Worst Week of My Life. In 2007 she featured in the BBC Wales programme Coming Home about her Welsh family history, with roots in Trefarclawdd and Ruabon.

In October 2007 Steadman appeared in Fanny Hill on BBC Four.

From May 2007 to January 2010 Steadman starred in the BBC comedy Gavin & Stacey as Pam Shipman. She returned in the role in the 2019 Christmas special. 
She appeared in Lewis as the Reverend Martha  Steadman in ‘Intelligent Design’ in 2013.

Steadman starred with Myra Frances in Girl, a 1974 BBC play in the Second City Firsts series, performing the first lesbian kiss on British television.

In 2014 Steadman starred in the first series of the BBC comedy Boomers as Joyce. The show returned with a Christmas Special in 2015 and a second series in 2016. In 2016 she presented the three-part series Little British Islands with Alison Steadman on Channel 4. The series visited Gigha, Jura, Colonsay and Oronsay in episode 1, Jersey, Alderney and Sark in episode 2 and the Isles of Scilly in episode 3. In 2016 she appeared as Abigail in the Midsomer Murders episode ‘The incident at Cooper Hill’.

In 2018 Steadman made a return to BBC1 with John Cleese in Hold the Sunset. On 9 December 2018 Steadman appeared in the BBC1 Drama ‘Care’ in the role of Mary.

Radio
On radio Steadman's talent for mimicry and character voices was given full rein in shows such as Week Ending, Castle's on the Air and The Worst Show on the Wireless. In the second and third of these she played the over-protective mother to Eli Woods' long-suffering Bunty/Precious. From 1982 to 1984 she joined Eli Woods and Eddie Braben (Morecambe and Wise'''s scriptwriter) in 13 episodes of the UK radio show The Show with No Name, which can be described as an updated version of Round the Horne comedy sketch show. Later, from 2002, she starred as Mrs Naughtie in the series Hamish and Dougal. Steadman had a spell in Roy Hudd's long-running comedy show The News Huddlines in the early to mid 1980s. In December 2009 she starred in Mike Stott's My Mad Grandad on BBC Radio 4. From 2012 she played Ginny Fox, a parody of Virginia Woolf, in the sitcom Gloomsbury. In 2018 she made a guest appearance in Radio 4's The Archers as Olwen, a friend of Jill Archer.

Personal life
In 1972 director Mike Leigh drove to Liverpool to see Ted Whitehead's play The Foursome, which featured Steadman. He asked her to be in his film Hard Labour'', during which, both said, they "got together". They married in 1973 and had two sons, Toby (b. 1978) and Leo (b. 1981). The couple lived with their sons in Wood Green, London. They separated in 1995 and divorced in 2001.

Steadman's partner is actor Michael Elwyn. The couple live in Highgate, London.

She is a birdwatcher and in November 2016 became an ambassador for London Wildlife Trust.

Filmography

Film

Television

Awards and nominations

References

External links

Biodata at Debrett's

1946 births
Living people
Alumni of East 15 Acting School
People educated at Childwall Valley High School for Girls
English film actresses
English radio actresses
English stage actresses
English voice actresses
English television actresses
Officers of the Order of the British Empire
Actresses from Liverpool
20th-century English actresses
21st-century English actresses
Birdwatchers